Dianthus strictus, known as the wild pink, is a species of flowering plant in the family Caryophyllaceae.

Description
Perennial, very variable. Leaves ciliate at base and scabrous at margin. Inflorescence loose, more or less branching. Scales of calyx pale, membranous, briefly aristate. Calyx conical-cylindrical, slightly tapered at apex, greenish-white, sometimes tinged with purple. Striations often limited to the apex of teeth and to some bands below sinuses. Petals pink, lamina fan-shaped, denticulate, marked with dots which gave the plant its name.

Flowering
The plant flowers any time from May–December.

Geographic area
It is endemic to Syria, Lebanon, the Palestine region, Egypt, Iraq, Cyprus, Turkey, Greece.

References

Georges Tohme& Henriette Tohme, IIIustrated Flora of Lebanon, National Council For Scientific Research, Second Edition 2014.

strictus
Flora of Cyprus
Flora of Egypt
Flora of Greece
Flora of Iraq
Flora of Palestine (region)
Flora of Lebanon and Syria
Flora of Turkey
Taxa named by Joseph Banks
Taxa named by Daniel Solander